Dyrtjørnhøi is a mountain in Vågå Municipality in Innlandet county, Norway. The mountain is surrounded by several other notable mountains including Gravdalsknappen and Ingulssjøhøi to the southwest, Besshø and Besseggen to the west, and Nautgardstinden to the northwest.

See also
List of mountains of Norway by height

References

Jotunheimen
Vågå
Mountains of Innlandet